A Place Apart is a book by Irish author Dervla Murphy. It was first published by John Murray in 1978, and won the Christopher Ewart-Biggs Memorial Prize in 1979. The book is usually given the subtitle Northern Ireland in the 1970s, but has been called A Record of Northern Ireland.

Summary
In A Place Apart, Murphy travelled by bicycle to Northern Ireland during the height of The Troubles. She tried to understand the situation by speaking to people from both the Catholic and Protestant side of the divide. Despite her own family connections to the IRA, Murphy travelled north unfettered by sectarian loyalties. She describes her own religious beliefs as

A Place Apart was the first book in which Murphy probed geopolitical developments alongside travel commentary. She includes a plea for the abandonment of Articles 2 and 3 of the Constitution of Ireland which, at the time of writing, strove to make the Island of Ireland one national territory. Murphy herself, however, identifies a later 1981 book on the nuclear arms industry, Race to the Finish?, as the turning point in the politicisation of her writing style.

The book includes a disputed account of Bloody Sunday:

Later in the book, Murphy covers the assassination of Christopher Ewart-Biggs, British Ambassador to the Republic: 

A Place Apart would go on to win the Christopher Ewart-Biggs Memorial Prize in 1979, awarded to books that promote peace and reconciliation in Ireland.

Publication history
The book was first published in 1978. Like Murphy's other earlier works, it was published by Jock Murray of the John Murray publishing house. When Jock died and his publishing house was sold, Murphy moved to Eland Books, who republished the book in 2014.

References

External links
 

1978 non-fiction books
Eland Books books
John Murray (publishing house) books
Books by Dervla Murphy